Douglas Charles McKenzie (15 March 1906 – 1 July 1979) was an Australian cricketer.

Douglas McKenzie represented Western Australia in four first-class matches as a right-handed batsman between 1934/1935 and 1945/1946. He also played in grade cricket.

His brother Eric and nephew Graham also played first-class cricket for Western Australia.

1906 births
1979 deaths
Australian cricketers
Western Australia cricketers
Cricketers from Melbourne